The Italian Associations in South America (Associazioni Italiane in Sud America, AISA) was an Italian political party representing voters living in South America, since many Italians have immigrated to South America.

The party won one seat in the Chamber of Deputies and one seat in the Senate in the 2006 general election. The party has been represented in the Senate by Luigi Pallaro and in the Chamber of Deputies by Ricardo Antonio Merlo, who left the party in 2008 in order to form the Associative Movement Italians Abroad.

Notably, former senator Pallaro was at the centre of a controversy, as he was the only independent elected member of the Senate in which the winning coalition, The Union, had just two more seats than the rival House of Freedoms, and he did not formally declare a preference for one of the two sides, although he generally supported the centre-left government of Romano Prodi.

Pallaro was not re-elected in the 2008 general election, thus ending his political career. Merlo was re-elected for the rival list.

Italian expatriate representation parties
Italy
Italian-Argentine culture